Futaleufú Airfield is an airport serving Futaleufú, a town in the Los Lagos Region of Chile.

Futaleufú is in a mountain valley  from the Argentina border. The airport is just east of the town, separated from it by a small lake. There is mountainous terrain nearby in all quadrants, with a large hill adjacent to the south side of the runway. An overrun to the west will drop into the lake.

See also

Transport in Chile
List of airports in Chile

References

External links
Futaleufú Airport at OpenStreetMap

Futaleufú Airport at FallingRain

Airports in Los Lagos Region